"Fins"  is a song performed by American popular music singer-songwriter Jimmy Buffett.  It was written by Buffett, Coral Reefer Band members Deborah McColl and Barry Chance, and author Tom Corcoran.  It was released as a single (b/w "Dreamsicle") on MCA 41109 in July 1979.

It was first released on his 1979 album Volcano. It reached number 35 on the US Billboard Hot 100 and number 42 on the Easy Listening chart.

The title refers to the fins of metaphorical sharks, i.e. "land sharks", men who attempt to pick up the woman who is the subject of the song.  She is said to feel like a remora due to the proximity of the predators.  

Cash Box said that "swinging southern pop-rock, served up Florida style, compliments the neat double entendre."  Record World said that Buffet's "inspired vocals and a lively beat give this broad appeal.."

"Fins" is one of Buffett's more popular songs with fans, and is part of "The Big 8" that he has played at almost all of his concerts. Recorded live versions of the song appear on Feeding Frenzy, Buffett Live: Tuesdays, Thursdays, Saturdays, and the video Live by the Bay.  Buffett usually begins the song with a few bars of the "Main Title" theme from the movie Jaws.  Concertgoers typically respond to the chorus line of "fins to the left, fins to the right" by extending their arms above their heads in a fin shape and moving them from left to right. Fin and shark themes have become a prominent part of parrothead (Buffett fan) clothing and gear and feature in several of Buffett's commercial ventures such as Land Shark Lager beer.

In 2009, Buffett wrote new lyrics to the song for the Miami Dolphins football team. The song is played during home games at Hard Rock Stadium, and is used in tandem with the Dolphins' fight song after every touchdown the team scores.

Chart performance

References

External links
Lyrics at BuffettWorld.com

1979 songs
Jimmy Buffett songs
Songs written by Jimmy Buffett
Miami Dolphins
MCA Records singles